The 1928–29 Campeonato Regional de Madrid was the 27th season of the Campeonato Regional Centro. Real Madrid, Athletic de Madrid and Racing de Madrid finished in the top three positions respectively and qualified for the 1928–29 Copa del Rey.

Primera Categoría

Segunda Categoría Preferente

Segunda Categoría

Torneo de Promoción 

Unión Sporting and Nacional retaining their spot for the 1929–30 season.

External links

Madrid